Sondre Bjorvand Tronstad (born 26 August 1995) is a Norwegian professional footballer who plays as a midfielder for Vitesse in Eredivisie. He has previously played for the Norwegian club Start, Haugesund and been contracted for two years to Huddersfield Town in the Football League Championship. Tronstad has represented his country both at youth and senior level.

Club career
Tronstad played for Tveit IL before he joined Start. In November 2009 he was on a trial with Manchester United together with his countrymen Herman Stengel and Mats Møller Dæhli. Tronstad made his first-team debut for Start in the First Division in 2012, and made his debut in Tippeligaen the following season. He has been compared to the former Start-player and Norway international, Fredrik Strømstad.

On 21 January 2014, Sondre joined Huddersfield Town on a -year deal.

On 24 January 2020, Tronstad joined Vitesse on a 3.5-year deal.

International career
Tronstad has played for Norwegian youth teams from under-16 to under-18 level.

Career statistics

Club

References

External links
 

1995 births
Living people
Association football midfielders
Norwegian footballers
Norway youth international footballers
Norway international footballers
IK Start players
Huddersfield Town A.F.C. players
SBV Vitesse players
Norwegian First Division players
Eliteserien players
Eredivisie players
Norwegian expatriate footballers
Expatriate footballers in England
Expatriate footballers in the Netherlands
Norwegian expatriate sportspeople in England
Sportspeople from Kristiansand